Sun Eater is the fourth studio album by American death metal band Job for a Cowboy. It was released on November 11, 2014, by Metal Blade Records. The album features session musician Danny Walker on drums, and Cannibal Corpse vocalist George "Corpsegrinder" Fisher guested on the song "The Synthetic Sea".

The album entered the US Billboard 200 at No. 91, selling 3,900 copies in the first week.

The album demonstrates a profound shift in the band's sound, pursuing a much more progressive musical style.

Track listing

Personnel 
Credits are adapted from the album liner notes, except where noted.

Job for a Cowboy
 Jonny Davy – vocals
 Tony Sanicandro – guitar
 Al Glassman – guitar
 Nick Schendzielos – bass

Session musicians
 Danny Walker – drums

Additional musicians
 George "Corpsegrinder" Fisher – vocals on "The Synthetic Sea"
 Jason Suecof – guitar solo on "Sun of Nihility"

Production
 Jason Suecof – production, engineering, mixing
 Peter Sanicandro – production (asst)
 Ronn Miller – drum tech, engineering (asst)
 Eyal Levi – additional engineering
 John Douglass – additional engineering
 Stinky – additional engineering

Visual art
 Tony Koehl – cover art
 Brian J. Ames – layout

Charts

References

External links
 
 Sun Eater at Metal Blade Records

2014 albums
Job for a Cowboy albums
Metal Blade Records albums
Albums produced by Jason Suecof